The Scotland national badminton team represents Scotland in international badminton team competitions. It is controlled by Badminton Scotland, the organization for badminton in the nation. The Scottish team have never participated in the Thomas Cup but have participated in the Uber Cup and the Sudirman Cup multiple times. The team reached the semifinals at the 2020 European Men's and Women's Team Badminton Championships.

World Championships medal table
Updated after XXVI edition (2021), does not include one stripped silver medal from 2014.

List of medalists

Participation in BWF competitions

Uber Cup

Sudirman Cup

Participation at the Commonwealth Games

Medal table

List of medalists

Participation in European Team Badminton Championships

Men's Team

Women's Team

Mixed Team

Participation in European Junior Team Badminton Championships
Mixed Team

Current squad 

Men
Callum Smith
Joshua Apiliga
Alexander Dunn
Adam Hall
Jack Macgregor
Adam Pringle
Ciar Pringle
Christopher Grimley
Matthew Grimley

Women
Kirsty Gilmour
Rachel Andrew
Julie Macpherson
Ciara Torrance
Lauren Middleton
Holly Newall
Eleanor O'Donnell
Sarah Sidebottom
Rachel Sugden

References

Mike's Badminton Populorum

Badminton
National badminton teams
Badminton in Scotland